The 1948–49 Ohio Bobcats men's basketball team represented Ohio University in the college basketball season of 1948–49. The team was coached by Dutch Trautwein in his 11th and final season and played their home games at the Men's Gymnasium.  They finished the season 6–16.  They finished last (sixth) in the Mid-American Conference with a conference record of 2–8.

Schedule

|-
!colspan=9 style=| Regular Season

 Source:

Statistics

Team Statistics
Final 1948–49 Statistics

Source

Player statistics

Source

References

Ohio Bobcats men's basketball seasons
Ohio
1948 in sports in Ohio
1949 in sports in Ohio